A list of films produced in Argentina in 2005:

See also
2005 in Argentina

External links and references
 Argentine films of 2005 at the Internet Movie Database

2005
Films
Argentine